Buangkok MRT station is an underground Mass Rapid Transit (MRT) station on the North East line (NEL) in Sengkang, Singapore. Located underneath Sengkang Central near the junction with Compassvale Bow, Buangkok station is one of the two MRT stations located within the Sengkang planning area and serves the town of Buangkok. The station is operated by SBS Transit.

First announced in March 1996 and beginning construction in April 1997, Buangkok station was one of two stations on the North East Line to not open when the line began service on 20 June 2003. It eventually opened on 15 January 2006, and developments around the station have increased since. Buangkok station features an Art-in-Transit artwork Water, Nature and the Contemporary by Vincent Leow.

History

Construction

The North East line (NEL) project, which was first proposed in 1984, received government approval in January 1996. Buangkok station was among the sixteen NEL stations announced by communications minister Mah Bow Tan in March that year.

Contract 702 for the construction of Sengkang and Buangkok stations was awarded to Sato Kogyo-Hock Lian Seng Engineering Joint Venture on 26 April 1997. The S$166.4 million (US$ million) contract included the construction of  connecting tunnels between the stations and  reception tunnels to Sengkang Depot.

The station was constructed in a forested area slated to serve an important new town in the future. After the forest was cleared and the vacated warehouses demolished, the station was constructed using the "open-cut" and "bottom-up" methods. The site was dug to a depth of up to  before the station was constructed upwards. Following the station's construction, roads were built to connect the station with existing roads.

Delay in opening
Just days before the opening of the NEL, operator SBS Transit announced on 17 June 2003 that two stations  – Woodleigh and Buangkok  – would not open along with the other NEL stations. Due to the lack of developments in their respective surroundings, the operator said keeping the stations closed would reduce operating costs by S$2–3 million. Residents around the system were upset by the sudden decision to keep Buangkok station closed, having been previously assured by MPs and grassroots leaders that the station would be opened. The government initially stood by SBS Transit's decision to keep the station closed, with plans to open the station only in 2006 when there were more residential flats built in the area. It was further pushed to 2008, following projections for the housing development plans for the area.

With the first development being ready at Compassvale Arcadia in April 2005, the station was opened on 15 January 2006. To prepare for the station's opening, the programming had to be updated to include Buangkok. Residents had said they would be willing to walk 400 metres to the station every day.

The station opened with much fanfare on that day, two and a half years after it was first built. SBS Transit had expected around 3,500 commuters using the station daily, which would be the lowest among all the stations along the line, resulting in the station making a loss.

Since its opening, however, the station only had 1,386 daily riders on average, as opposed to the expected 6,000 daily riders. Many residents still traveled to the adjacent stations of Sengkang and Hougang due to the amenities around these stations. Nevertheless, SBS Transit, after stating that it was still "too early to draw a conclusion" on the ridership, remained committed to keeping the station open so it could serve future developments nearby.

First white elephant incident
On 28 August 2005, during Minister Vivian Balakrishnan's visit to Punggol South, a resident, displeased with Buangkok's disuse, erected a series of white paper cut-outs of elephants, which were drawn in a cartoon-like style, symbolically calling the unopened Buangkok station a 'white elephant'. Soon after, police started an investigation on it as a case of a public display without permit, on the grounds that a complaint was received and that they may have been in violation of the Public Entertainment and Meetings Act, for which the maximum penalty is a fine not exceeding $10,000. It raised controversy because many people saw it as a harmless, trivial case not worthy of investigation. It also highlighted the general displeasure over the non-operation of the MRT station after it was built with public funds. It also raised questions on how much freedom of expression the government is willing to tolerate. On 6 October that year, police closed the investigation without pressing charges but issued a stern warning to the offender. This led then-Deputy Prime Minister Wong Kan Seng to comment to the media, "We cannot apply the law to some and turn a blind eye to others. If we do, then the law becomes the real white elephant."

Second white elephant incident

On 13 January 2006, during a carnival celebrating the opening of the MRT station, some 27 students from Raffles Girls' School were preparing to sell T-shirts bearing "Save the White Elephants" to raise funds for a charity Youth Guidance. This prompted a warning from the police that they needed a fund-raising permit and that "wearing of T-shirts en masse may be misconstrued by some as an offence under the Miscellaneous Offences (Public & Order & Nuisance) (Assemblies & Processions) Rules."

The girls said that they had always taken a strong interest in current affairs and Buangkok incident inspired them to start what they called "Project White Elephant" aiming to "galvanise the youth of today to rise up from the apathy they are stereotyped with and take an active role in airing their views". Punggol South grassroots leaders were impressed by their "entrepreneurial spirit and derring-do", and invited them to set up a stall at the opening ceremony of the station to sell the T-shirts.

On 21st of that month, Deputy Prime Minister Wong Kan Seng apologised for the way the police had overreacted to the group of school girls' plan to sell and wear white elephant T-shirts at the opening of Buangkok station.

Details
Buangkok station serves the North East line (NEL) of the Singapore MRT and is between the Hougang and Sengkang stations. The station code is NE15. Being part of the NEL, the station is operated by SBS Transit. The station operates daily from about 5:45am to 12:25am. Train frequencies vary from 2.5 to 5.0 minutes.

Buangkok station is located in Sengkang along the road of Sengkang Central near the junction with Compassvale Bow. The station has two entrances serving the surrounding HDB flats and two schools Palm View Primary School and North Vista Primary School. The station also serves Sengkang Grand Residencies, an integrated development including a retail mall and an upcoming bus interchange.

Unlike the other NEL stations, the entrances of Buangkok station do not employ glass in their design; white Teflon sheets supported by metal frames envelop the entrances. The station is designated as a Civil Defence (CD) shelter: it is designed to accommodate at least 7,500 people and withstand airstrikes and chemical attacks. Equipment essential for the operations in the CD shelter is mounted on shock absorbers to prevent damage during a bombing. When the electrical supply to the shelter is disrupted, there are backup generators to keep operations going. The shelter has dedicated built-in decontamination chambers and dry toilets with collection bins that will send human waste out of the shelter.

References

Bibliography

External links
 Official website

Railway stations in Singapore opened in 2006
Railway stations in Sengkang
Sengkang
Mass Rapid Transit (Singapore) stations